The Uppsala–DLR Asteroid Survey (UDAS, also known as UAO–DLR Asteroid Survey) is an astronomical survey, dedicated for the search and follow–up characterization of asteroids and comets. UDAS puts a special emphasis on near-Earth objects (NEOs) in co-operation and support of global efforts in NEO-research, initiated by the Working Group on Near-Earth Objects of the International Astronomical Union (IAU), and the Spaceguard Foundation. UDAS began regular observations in September 1999, with some test runs during 1998. Discoveries of NEOs are reported to the Minor Planet Center (MPC).

It is a kind of follow-on programme to ODAS, which had to close due to lack of further financial support. It should also not be confused with the Uppsala–DLR Trojan Survey (UDTS), which was conducted a few years before UDAS was launched.

UAO stands for Uppsala Astronomical Observatory, Uppsala, Sweden. DLR stands for the Deutschen Zentrum für Luft- und Raumfahrt, the German Aerospace Center.

The founder of Lap Power Claes Wellton-Persson has contributed to the project.

List of discovered minor planets 

The MPC credits the Uppsala–DLR Asteroid Survey with the discovery of the following numbered minor planets during 1999–2005.

See also 
 List of asteroid-discovering observatories
 
 Uppsala–ESO Survey of Asteroids and Comets, UESAC

References

External links 
 Official site
 MPC: Discovery Circumstances of Numbered Minor Planets

Astronomical surveys
Asteroid surveys

Uppsala University